The Basque Country tournament is an annual football competition held in Spain which serves as the preliminary round of the  Copa Federación de España (Copa RFEF) in the Basque Country (Euskadi) region. Organised by the Basque Football Federation, the participating clubs in the tournament are drawn from the Tercera División (Group 4), as well as local clubs in the Segunda División B who have not qualified for the season's Copa del Rey, including reserve teams and farm teams. Not all teams eligible take part each year.

As the Copa RFEF is for lower division clubs, the top sides in the region such as Athletic Bilbao and Real Sociedad have never entered the main competition or the qualifying phase. However, Deportivo Alavés have taken part in the national phase, and their B-team won the Basque tournament three years in a row from 2015.

Format
The regional tournament is usually played between July and October, the format depends on the number of registered teams, and the winner receives a €3,000 prize. 

The champion qualifies to the National phase of the Copa RFEF. At that point, losing teams from the first round of the Copa del Rey, usually including at least one Basque club, are also invited to the Copa RFEF, but often they decline to participate in order to concentrate on the league.

The opening nationwide rounds pair entrants from either the same autonomous community or one nearby (such as Navarre or Cantabria), so it is common for the Basque teams to eliminate each other.

History
The most successful Basque qualifier to the national phase was Real Unión, who won the entire competition in 2015, defeating CD Castellón 4–0 on aggregate.

SD Lemona were finalists in 2011 and 2012, with the latter event producing a dramatic outcome: having lost the first leg away to CD Binissalem by a 5–0 score, Lemona turned the tie on its head at home, winning 6–1. They lost on away goals, being unable to add to their tally in the last 15 minutes of the match. Within a few months of the final, the club had dissolved due to financial problems. Lemona also have the best overall record in the qualifying tournament, winning five times in 16 years.

Notes

Champions
Editions with only one team registered not included in this ranking.

Previous competitions
From 1930 until 1987, Biscay and Gipuzkoa operated separate provincial competitions for their non-professional clubs, with the winners of each qualifying for the national Campeonato de Aficionados, the predecessor to the Copa Federación. The most successful team in Biscay was Erandio with 13 wins, far ahead of Indautxu on 6, while in Gipuzkoa Real Unión, CD Logroñés and Mondragón won four titles apiece.

References

External links 
 Basque Football Federation 

Football in the Basque Country (autonomous community)
Copa Federación de España
Basque football competitions